The Carlos Palanca Memorial Awards for Literature winners in the year 1994 (rank, title of winning entry, name of author).


English division
Short story
First prize: "The Flight" by Katrina Tuvera
Second prize: "Sanded Soles" by Ma. Romina Gonzales
Third prize: "Black" by Jessica Zafra

Short story for children
First prize: "What is Serendipity?" by Muriel Macaraig
Second prize: "The Dream Weavers" by Ma. Carla Pacis
Third prize: "Veronica" by Marilen Cawad

Poetry
First prize: "Journey to Luna and Other Poems of Passage" by Ma. Luisa A. Igloria; and "The Link Immemorial" by Clovis Nazareno
Second prize: "Enkanto" by Ma. Luisa A. Igloria; and "Every Day Things" by Fidelito Cortes
Third prize: "Random Access Memories" by Alma Aileen Joy S. Anonas; "The Leavings of Family and Lovers" by Leigh Reyes; and "The Most Careful of Stars" by Ruel S. De Vera

Essay
First prize: "Reclaiming Vanished Geographies and Identities by Ma. Luisa A. Igloria
Second prize: "The Ludic Pleasures of Eating Words" by Marjorie Evasco
Third prize: "Bodies, Letters, Catalogues; Filipinas in Transnational Space" by Roland Tolentino; and "Orlando Nadres and the Politics of Homosexual Identity" by J. Neil C. Garcia

One-act play
First prize: "In the Works Department" by Nicolas B. Pichay
Second prize: "Loving Toto" by Dean Francis Alfar
Third prize: "Caves" by Bobby Flores Villasis; and "T.G.I.F." by Corinna Esperanza A. Nuqui

Full-length play
First prize: No winner
Second prize: "Island" by Dean Francis Alfar
Third prize: "Sky Legends" by Rodolfo C. Vera
Honorable mention: "Broken Icons" by Al Claude Evangelio; and "The Paraplegics" by Edilberto K. Tiempo

Filipino division
Short story
First prize: "Ang Pangangaluluwa" by Jimmuel C. Naval
Second prize: "Pinsan" by Eli Rueda Guieb III
Third prize: "Mga Kagilagilalas na Kababalaghan sa Ilang" by Levy Balgos Dela Cruz

Short story for children
First prize: "Si Duglahi, Isang Patak ng Dugo" by Luis P. Gatmaitan
Second prize: "Si Pinky, Si Tsinita, Si Rita Ritz at si Barbie" by Simplicio Bisa
Third prize: "Dagat sa Kama ni Troy" by Rene O. Villanueva

Poetry
First prize: "Kalatong at Iba pang Himig ng Paglalakbay" by Roberto T. Añonuevo; and "Sa Kandungan ng Cordillera at iba pang Tula" by Romulo P. Baquiran Jr.
Second prize: "Huling Hirit ni San Jose at Iba pang Tula" by German V. Gervacio
Third prize: "Kay Tu Fu na Makauunawa sa Hindi Ko Babanggitin sa mga Taludtod na Ito" by Benilda S. Santos; and "Mga Tula sa Sandali ng Tunggali" by Roberto Ofanda Umil

Essay
First prize: "Dalawang Alon sa Iisang Agos" by Buenaventura S. Medina Jr.
Second prize: "Saling-Talinhaga: Pagsilang, Pagdayo, Pagbabalik" by Buenaventura S. Medina Jr.
Third prize: "Hunab Kurditan, Sugilanong Lubad Atbp" by Nilo Ocampo

One-act play
First prize: "Ambon ng Kristal" by Elmer Gatchalian
Second prize: "Ang Dating Magkasintahan" ni Jose Bernard Capino; and "Buwan, Salawahang Buwan" by Rodolfo R. Lana Jr.
Third prize: "Dobol" by Rene O. Villanueva; and "Taguan sa Ulan" by Blaise Rogel Gacoscos

Full-length play
First prize: "Kalantiaw" by Rene O. Villanueva
Second prize: "Lutong Bahay" by Glecy C. Atienza
Third prize: "Mga Estranghero at Ang Gabi" by Rodolfo R. Lana Jr.

Teleplay
First prize: "Maulap ang Langit sa Kanluran" by Ella N. Madrigal
Second prize: "Sayaw ng Kamatayan" by Levy Balgos Dela Cruz
Third prize: "Hello... Paalam" by Fanny A. Garcia; and "Isang Araw sa Isang Bahay Ampunan" ni Evelyn Estrella-Sebastian

Screenplay
First prize: "Kulay Luha ang Pag-ibig" by Rolando S. Tinio
Second prize: "Ang Babae sa Burol" by Alfred Adlawan; and "Ang Lalakeng Nangarap Maging Anghel Ngunit..." by Lito Casaje by
Third prize: "Bonsai" by Elsa Martinez Coscolluela; and "Dayo" by Ramon Felipe Sarmiento

References
 

Palanca Awards
Palanca Awards, 1994